Mario-Giuseppe Bonini (19 August 1897 - date of death unknown) was an Italian middle-distance runner who competed at the 1920 Summer Olympics and 1924 Summer Olympics.

References

External links
 

1897 births
Date of death unknown
Athletes (track and field) at the 1920 Summer Olympics
Athletes (track and field) at the 1924 Summer Olympics
Italian male middle-distance runners
Olympic athletes of Italy
Italian Athletics Championships winners